Anne Smith and Kevin Curren were the defending champions and won in the final 6–7, 7–6(7–4), 7–6(7–5) against Barbara Potter and Ferdi Taygan.

Seeds
Champion seeds are indicated in bold text while text in italics indicates the round in which those seeds were eliminated.

Draw

Final

Top half

Bottom half

References
1982 US Open – Doubles draws and results at the International Tennis Federation

Mixed Doubles
US Open (tennis) by year – Mixed doubles